Robert Clarke (1717-1782) was an Anglican priest in Ireland during the 18th Century.

Clarke was born in Drogheda and educated at Trinity College, Dublin. He was Dean of Tuam from 1775 until his death.

References

Alumni of Trinity College Dublin
Deans of Tuam
18th-century Irish Anglican priests
1782 deaths
1717 births
People from Drogheda